The culture of Dubai, an emirate of the United Arab Emirates. Simultaneously, increasing globalization and the settling of various immigrant groups have transformed the city into a melting pot of different nationalities and have given rise to a cosmopolitan culture that is in sync with other global cities. The UAE culture mainly revolves around the religion of Islam and traditional Arab culture. The influence of Islamic and Arab culture on its architecture, music, attire, cuisine, and lifestyle are very prominent as well. Five times every day, Muslims are called to prayer from the minarets of mosques which are scattered around the country. Since 2006, the weekend has been Friday-Saturday, as a compromise between Friday's holiness to Muslims and the Western weekend of Saturday-Sunday. In 2005, 84% of the population of metropolitan Dubai was foreign-born, about half of them from India. The city's cultural imprint as a small, ethnically homogenous pearling community was changed with the arrival of other ethnic groups and nationals—first by the Iranians in the early 1900s, and later by Indians and Pakistanis in the 1960s.

History

Laid-back attitude 
Due to the touristic approach of many Dubaites in the entrepreneurial sector and the high standard of living, Dubai's culture has gradually evolved towards one of luxury, opulence, and lavishness with high regard for leisure-related extravagance. A combination of local prosperity and visions of a Dubaian tourist Mecca by successive Dubaian rulers have resulted in numerous forms of infrastructure that caters to self-indulgence, coziness, and a pleasurable sense of living the high-life.

Prosperity
The process of urbanizing Dubai with futuristic architecture has led to derivative terms iconizing Dubai as the world center of pioneering, ultramodern and cutting-edge buildings. This design has been described by some publishers as a blueprint of state-of-the-art aesthetic contours along with record-breaking ornamental features and technology, which is a model to be followed by other nations. The present participle "Dubaizing" and other Dubai suffixed lemmas have become neologisms in other regions indicating prosperity.

Art

See also

 Culture Village
 Dubai Culture and Arts Authority
 DUCTAC

References